Longwarry railway station is located on the Gippsland line in Victoria, Australia. It serves the town of Longwarry, and opened on 1 July 1881.

The track east of the station to Drouin was duplicated in 1952, but the section between Bunyip and Longwarry remains single track, because the bridge over the Bunyip River has not been duplicated. The line through Longwarry to Warragul was electrified in July 1954, but electrification was removed in December 1998.

On 26 August 1988, the electric staff safeworking system between Longwarry and Bunyip was abolished, and was replaced with automatic three-position signalling. The double line block system between Longwarry and Warragul was also abolished, along with the signal box and all two position signals. At the same time, boom barriers were provided at the Yannathan Road level crossing, replacing hand-operated gates. By October 1989, the connections to the former goods siding was abolished, as was the overhead wire above the siding.

As part of the Regional Rail Revival project, a second platform will be built at the station, and the line between Bunyip and Longwarry was scheduled to be duplicated, with the project to be completed in late 2022. However, it was reported in May 2022, that the duplication of the Bunyip-Longwarry track would not go ahead.

Platforms and services
Longwarry has one platform. It is served by V/Line Traralgon and selected Bairnsdale line trains.

Platform 1:
 services to Traralgon, Bairnsdale and Southern Cross

Transport links
Warragul Bus Lines operates one route via Longwarry station, under contract to Public Transport Victoria:
Garfield station – Traralgon Plaza

References

External links
Victorian Railway Stations Gallery
Melway map

Railway stations in Australia opened in 1881
Regional railway stations in Victoria (Australia)
Transport in Gippsland (region)
Shire of Baw Baw